Sudan is divided into fifteen states (wilayat, sing. wilayah) which in turn are subdivided into 86 districts. Before the secession of South Sudan on July 9, 2011, Sudan was the largest country in Africa and had 25 states.

 
Sudan
Sudan